Varney is an  unincorporated community in Mingo County, West Virginia, United States.

History
Development of the Appalachian Regional Airport north of Varney began in 2012.  The airport was "about 95 percent complete" in July 2018, and had "several hurdles to clear" before it could open.

References

Unincorporated communities in Mingo County, West Virginia
Unincorporated communities in West Virginia